The Very Best Of is a 1998 compilation album by Canadian singer-songwriter Alannah Myles, her first compilation after four studio albums.

Background

Released as a "parting gift" to Myles' former label, Atlantic Records, with whom she had released her first three studio albums, this compilation served to terminate her contract with the label. Released through Ark 21 Records, the label ran by Myles' then-manager Miles Copeland III that had released Myles' fourth album A Rival, the compilation includes material from her four studio albums, with the songs personally hand-picked and sequenced by Myles herself.

Including most of her singles released up to that point, including her best-known hit "Black Velvet", Myles also recorded two new songs for the compilation: a cover of Linda Ronstadt's 1970 hit "Long, Long Time" and the Peter Zizzo & Nicky Holland-written original "Break The Silence". The latter was released as a promotional single, and in 2001 was covered by Russian singer Alsou.

Myles saw no royalties or residuals from the sales of this album and litigated with Copeland for years until reaching an agreement and gaining back the new material from the compilation in 2014. As a result, Myles released "Long Long Time" as a digital single through her own label Fascinate in August 2015.

Release and reception

First released in November 1998 in Canada and Europe, the USA release did not happen until April 1999. The Canadian and USA editions feature 12 tracks, while the European edition has three bonus songs selected by Copeland: "The Great Divide", from 1997's "A Rival", which had been touted at the time as a second single off the album, and two songs from film soundtracks which were released as singles in Europe: "You Love Who You Love" (from the film Two If by Sea) and a duet with Italian singer Zucchero "What Are We Waiting For" (from the film Prince Valiant).

Track listing

1998 compilation albums
Alannah Myles albums
Epic Records compilation albums